North-Eastern Hill University (NEHU) is a Central University established on 19 July 1973 by an Act of the Indian Parliament. The university is in the suburb of Shillong, the state capital of Meghalaya, India. The university has two campuses: Shillong and Tura both are in Meghalaya. The first pro-vice chancellor was Early Rising Singha

It is the University Grants Commission's University with Potential for Excellence (conferred in 2006). It was established as a regional university for the states of northeast India, including Meghalaya, Nagaland, Arunachal Pradesh and Mizoram, and had given birth to Nagaland University in 1994 and Mizoram University in 2001.

Campus

NEHU has two academic campuses, one at Mawkynroh-Umshing, Shillong, and another at Chasingre, Tura. Shillong is the headquarters of academic and administrative functions. The main campus is 1225 acres in area. It accommodates National Council of Science Museums (NCSM), Indira Gandhi National Open University (IGNOU), Indian Council of Social Science Research (ICSSR), Sports Authority of India (SAI) and The English and Foreign Languages University (EFLU).

Organisation and administration

Governance
The head of the administration is the vice-chancellor (VC), who is appointed by the visitor of the university, the President of India, for a five-year tenure. The Governor of Meghalaya is the chief rector. Under the VC are two pro-vice-chancellors, one for each of the two campuses, Tura and Shillong, and a Registrar. , the VC is Prof. Prabha Shankar Shukla.

Initially, the academic departments and the administration of NEHU at Shillong functioned from three prime sites in the Shillong city; one from the former Maharaja of Mayurbhanj, the other from the Rani of Bijni and the third one from the Government of Meghalaya, popularly known as Horse-Shoe Building. The university now runs its central administration from its main campus in Mawkynroh-Umshing.

Schools
The university has the following schools, departments and centres of studies:
 School of Economics, Management etc.
Agri-Business Management and Food Technology (Tura)
Commerce Department
Economics Department
Journalism and Mass Communication
Library & Information Science department
Management Department (Tura)
Tourism and Hotel Management Department
 School of Education
Adult and Continuing Education Department
Centre for Distance Education
Centre for Science Education
Education Department
Education Department, Tura Campus
 School of Human & Environmental Sciences
Anthropology Department
Environmental Studies Department
Geography Department
Horticulture Department
Rural Development and Agricultural Production
 School of Humanities
English Department
English Department (Tura Campus)
Garo Department (Tura Campus)
Hindi Department
Khasi Department
Linguistics Department
Philosophy Department
 School of Life Sciences
Biochemistry Department
Biotechnology & Bioinformatics Department
Botany Department
Zoology Department
 School of Physical Sciences
Chemistry Department
Mathematics Department
Physics Department
Statistics Department
 School of Social Sciences
Cultural & Creative Studies Department
History & Archaeology Department, Tura Campus
History Department
Law Department
Political Science Department
Sociology Department
 School of Technology(SOT)
Architecture Department
Basic Sciences & Social Sciences Department
Biomedical Engineering Department
Computer Applications Department
Electronics and Communication
Energy Engineering Department
Information Technology Department
Nanotechnology Department

Jurisdictions and affiliated colleges

The jurisdiction of the university extended originally to the states of Meghalaya and Nagaland and the erstwhile Union Territories of Arunachal Pradesh and Mizoram. With the establishment of the Nagaland University on 6 September 1994, the jurisdiction of NEHU ceased over Nagaland. Likewise with the establishment of the Mizoram University the jurisdiction of NEHU over Mizoram also ceased from June 2001. Arunachal Pradesh has its own university.

Academics

Library  
The Central Library started in 1973 with a collection of 600 books. Its membership demographic includes university and college teachers, postgraduate and undergraduate honors students and members of the non-teaching staff. The permanent library at Shillong campus was funded by the Indian Ministry of Development of North Eastern Region (MDoNER) and inaugurated in 2006. It now has a collection of over 230,000 books, 38,000 bound periodicals and it subscribes to 316 foreign and 366 Indian journals.
Readers can also have access to Thesis works compiled by PhD recipients over the years. The library is technologically endowed for ease and comfort of the students. A highly qualified library staff is available to assist students with any help they need. The library has a collection of rare works by leading Indian scholars some of which are not available anywhere, but certain libraries in the country.

Rankings

The National Institutional Ranking Framework (NIRF) ranked North-Eastern Hill University 90th overall in India and 59th among universities in 2021.

References

External links

Universities in Meghalaya
Central universities in India

NEHU
1973 establishments in Meghalaya
Education in Shillong